Harriet Hilreth Weeks (February 28, 1875 – May 24, 1939) was an American politician and teacher.

Weeks was born in Clay County, Minnesota. She lived in Troy, New York from 1882 to 1895. Weeks married Dr. Leonard Case Weeks in 1898 and they lived in Detroit Lakes, Minnesota. She was a teacher, a member of the League of Women Voters, and a Republican. Weeks served in the Minnesota House of Representatives from 1929  to 1932.

References

1875 births
1939 deaths
People from Clay County, Minnesota
People from Detroit Lakes, Minnesota
People from Troy, New York
Educators from Minnesota
Women state legislators in Minnesota
Republican Party members of the Minnesota House of Representatives